The Greater Copenhagen Fire Department (formerly ) forms the largest municipal fire brigade in Denmark with more than 1000 employees. This includes firefighters, ambulance personnel,  administration and service workers and workers in fire prevention.

History 
The brigade began as the Copenhagen Royal Fire Brigade on 9 July 1687 under King Christian V. After the passing of the Copenhagen Fire Act on 18 May 1868, on 1 August 1870 the Copenhagen Fire Brigade became a municipal institution in its own right. In 1898, its responsibilities were extended to include the Ambulance Service. The Helmeted Firemen Service was inaugurated in 1930 and the Civil Contingency Planning Department in 1998. The fire department has its headquarters in the Copenhagen Central Fire Station located behind the City Hall. Designed by Ludvig Fenger in the Historicist style, it was inaugurated in 1892.

On April 28, 2013 suspected arsonist fire ripped through the Museum of Danish Resistance in Copenhagen. Firefighters arrived within minutes of the alarm and quickly determined, that the old, largely wooden structure couldn't be saved, so the fire fighters were split into groups either stalling the blaze or emptying the museum for its historical artefacts from World War II. The department managed to clear close to all the artifacts, thereby rescuing the heritage of the Danish resistance movement during the Nazi occupation of Denmark almost in its entirety. For this action, the Danish National Museum in 2014 awarded the Copenhagen Fire Department its jubilee medal for invaluable service.

Fire stations

Copenhagen Central Fire Station 
Copenhagen Central Fire Station is located to the rear of Copenhagen City Hall.

Christianshavn Fire Station 
Christianshavn Fire Station is located at Markmandsgade 15 in Christianshavn.

Frederiksberg Fire Station 
Frederiksberg Fire Station  is located on Howitzvej (No.  26( in Frederiksberg. The building is part of a complex which also comprises Solbjerg Church and Frederiksberg Courthouse..

Fælledvej Fire Station 
Fælledvej Fire Station is located on Fælledvej (No. 20 A( in Nørrebro.

Østerbro Fire Station 
Østerbro Fire Station is located on Østbanegade (No. 89) in Østerbro.

Vesterbro Fire Station 
Vesterbro Fire Station is located on Enghavevej (Bo. 168-170) in Kongens Enghave.

Tomsgården Fire Station 
Tomsgården Fire Station is located at Frederikssundsvej 83 B in Bispebjerg.

Glostrup Fire Station 
Glostrup Fire station is located at Bryggergårdsvej 3 in Glostrup.

Hvidovre Fire Station 
Hvidovre Fire Station is located at Avedøre Havnevej 37 in Hvidovre.

Gearhallen Dispatch 
Gearhallen Dispatch is located at Gearhalsvej 1 in Valby.

Dragør Fire Station 
Dragør Fire Station is located at Nyby 4 in Dragør.

Store Magleby Fire Station 
Store Magleby Fire Station is located at Kirkevej 9 in Dragør.

References

External links 
 Greater Copenhagen Fire Department website
 Københavns Brandvlsens historie

1687 establishments in Denmark
Organizations based in Copenhagen
Copenhagen Municipality
Fire and rescue services of Denmark